Alex José de Oliveira Fraga (born May 22, 1986), is a Brazilian central back who plays for J. Malucelli.

Career
Alex Fraga began his career in the youth ranks of Atlético Paranaense and helped his side capture the Dallas Cup in 2004 and 2005. He made his professional debut with Atlético-PR in 2-2 home draw against Iraty in the Campeonato Paranaense on February 25, 2006. In 2009, he was loaned to Ituano and played in the Paulista league.

After a brief stay with Ituano, Fraga joined Georgian Premier League side  Olimpi Rustavi on loan for the 2009-10 season. In his one year in Georgia Fraga started 31 games and scored one goal in helping Olimpi Rustavi to capture its second Georgian League title.

Honours
Atlético Paranaense
Dallas Cup: 2004, 2005
 Olimpi Rustavi
Georgian Premier League:2009-10

References

External links

 rubronegro.net 
 
 CBF 
 furacao.com 
 atleticopr.com 
 
 

1986 births
Living people
Brazilian footballers
Brazilian expatriate footballers
Brazilian expatriate sportspeople in Georgia (country)
Club Athletico Paranaense players
FC Metalurgi Rustavi players
Expatriate footballers in Georgia (country)
Clube Náutico Capibaribe players
Ituano FC players
Association football defenders